{{DISPLAYTITLE:C6H13O9P}}
The molecular formula C6H13O9P may refer to:

 Fructose 1-phosphate
 Fructose 6-phosphate
 Galactose 1-phosphate
 Glucose 1-phosphate
 Glucose 6-phosphate
 Mannose 1-phosphate
 Mannose 6-phosphate

Molecular formulas